Ruslan Naurzaliev (born December 21, 1984, in Shirin) is an Uzbekistani rower. He is also a member of Republican WSS Rowing Club, and is coached and trained by Zamir Baymuratov.

At age nineteen, Naurzaliev made his official debut for the 2004 Summer Olympics in Athens, where he and his partner Sergey Bogdanov finished fifth in the semi-final round of the men's lightweight double sculls, with a time of 6:45.47.

At the 2008 Summer Olympics in Beijing, Naurzaliev competed as the nation's lone rower in the men's single sculls, an event which was later dominated by defending Olympic champion Olaf Tufte of Norway. He came only in third place and twenty-sixth overall of this event by three seconds behind Iran's Mohsen Shadi, with a time of 7:06.54.

References

External links

NBC 2008 Olympics profile

1984 births
Living people
Uzbekistani male rowers
Olympic rowers of Uzbekistan
Rowers at the 2004 Summer Olympics
Rowers at the 2008 Summer Olympics
Asian Games medalists in rowing
Rowers at the 2006 Asian Games
Rowers at the 2010 Asian Games
Rowers at the 2014 Asian Games
Asian Games gold medalists for Uzbekistan
Asian Games silver medalists for Uzbekistan
Medalists at the 2006 Asian Games
Medalists at the 2010 Asian Games
21st-century Uzbekistani people